Aianteion may refer to:
Aianteion, Salamis, a village on Salamis Island, Greece
Aianteion (Thrace), a town of ancient Thrace, now in Turkey
Aianteion (Troad), a town of the ancient Troad, now in Turkey